NGC 294 is an open cluster located in the Small Magellanic Cloud in the constellation Tucana. It was discovered on April 11, 1834 by John Herschel, although it was possibly observed on September 5, 1826 by James Dunlop.

References

External links
 

0294
18340411
18260905
Tucana (constellation)
Discoveries by James Dunlop
Small Magellanic Cloud
Open clusters